HMS Prudent was a 64-gun third rate ship of the line of the Royal Navy, launched on 28 September 1768 at Woolwich.

She is listed as being on harbour service in 1779, though she was back in regular service later in the American Revolutionary War as in 1782 she participated in the Battle of St. Kitts.

Prudent was at Plymouth on 20 January 1795 and so shared in the proceeds of the detention of the Dutch naval vessels, East Indiamen, and other merchant vessels that were in port on the outbreak of war between Britain and the Netherlands.

Prudent was sold out of the service in 1814.

Notes

References

Lavery, Brian (2003) The Ship of the Line - Volume 1: The development of the battlefleet 1650-1850. Conway Maritime Press. .

Ships of the line of the Royal Navy
Exeter-class ships of the line
1768 ships